Today's Special is a Canadian children's television program produced by Clive VanderBurgh at TVOntario, originally broadcasting 120 episodes from 1981 to 1987. Much of the series was set in a department store, based on Simpson's then-flagship location in Toronto. Some store sequences were shot at the Queen Street West and Yonge Street store after hours.  The show ran on TVOntario in Canada as well as Nickelodeon in the United States.

Premise 
In the children's department of a major department store, each night when Jodie arrives for work, she carries a mannequin (Jeff) upstairs, where Muffy says the magic words "hocus pocus alimagocus!" This brings him to life.

Many early episodes focused on a tangible object as a subject, such as hats or costumes, with the show revolving around teaching about it. Later episodes dealt with more complicated ones, such as the episode "Wishes" dealing with sacrificing one thing for another, "Butterflies", which deals with death,  or "Phil's Visit", which dealt with alcoholism.

Short films, often less than a minute long, were often inserted as breaks in the episode's main plot, narrated by Robyn Hayle (the same actress who provided the voice of TXL). These included Mime Lady segments, animated quizzes designed to test a child's observation, narrated storybooks, and popular nursery rhymes (which an unseen Muffy would introduce with "And now I'd like to introduce a nursery rhyme by Mother Goose").

Many episodes featured one or more one-time visitors to the store. Some would cause problems for the characters, while others would befriend them and help solve their problems. These visitors included the characters' friends or family, people coming to the store to do their jobs, people brought there by magic ("Treasure Hunts", "The Queen of Hearts"), bizarre, non-human characters ("Space", "Sam and the Robot"), and real-life celebrities ("Opera", "Trash").  Magic was important to many episodes, and the characters sometimes would have an adventure that involved it.

Cast and characters 
 Jeff (Jeff Hyslop): A mannequin with a magic hat that makes him come to life when someone says "hocus pocus alimagocus". If it comes off his head, he turns back into a mannequin. He can't leave the store or he will remain a mannequin forever (he can only go outside onto the building's roof or, in very rare episodes, when traveling by magic). Because he has not been alive for very long, he knows little about many everyday objects (at least in earlier seasons). However, he is often shown to be a fast learner, a deep thinker, and a source of ideas. He is also a very talented dancer, which he at some point demonstrates in nearly every episode. Though he wishes that he were not bound by the rules of the spell that keeps him alive, he puts his friends' needs first.
 Jodie (Nerene Virgin): The store's display designer. Portrayed as a sweet, level-headed woman, she functions as a mentor and teacher to Jeff, who is relatively new to the world. He often works as her assistant in setting up the displays. Although she has no established authority, she usually takes a leadership role among the characters. Her words are often comforting to others, and she is always ready to help her friends with their problems.
 Sam Crenshaw (puppet, Bob Dermer): The store's security guard. Born in 1919, he is the oldest of the four main characters.  He is a generally laid-back individual, as the years have worn him down. He often fails to notice or realize certain things around him at first, though when he does, he is known to get hysterical about it. He doesn't seem particularly bright and is sometimes clumsy, but he means well and is capable in his job. He is a retired sailor and a veteran of the Boer Wars, and his signature song is "Singin' Yo Hee Ho". He's a widower and also has a pet cat named Penelope that Muffy is afraid of. He sometimes uses the TXL Series 4 computer to mind the store.
 Muffy Mouse (puppet, Nina Keogh): A mouse who speaks in rhyme and lives in the store all the time. She plays the piano, rides a scooter, and wears a feather boa around her neck like a lasso. She also plays tricks on people, and enjoys mischievous acts. As a mouse, she is obsessed with cheese and other snacks. She's young, naive and her fear of cats makes mention of them a pet peeve. She is usually the first one to get upset or frustrated over a situation, and her cousin, Mort, visits her on occasion.

Recurring characters
 TXL Series 4 (Robyn Hayle): The store's computer system. Sam operates it from the security room. It appears to have a feminine persona. Despite being a machine, it is suggested that it is capable of human emotions.
 Mrs. Pennypacker (puppet, Cheryl Wagner): An employee who runs the stock room at night. She is an elderly lady who shows her age in terms of physical appearance more than Sam does, but often appears more enthusiastic and full of energy than him. Her motto is "I know where everything goes" and the others sometimes call upon her knowledge of the store's layout to find obscure or special items.
 Mort (puppet, Bob Stutt): Muffy's cousin from the farm. His country lifestyle tends to contrast with her city life. He, like her, speaks in rhyme, and often comes to visit.
 Waldo the Magnificent (Barrie Baldaro): The magician who originally brought Jeff to life. A rather wise but somewhat inept man, the spells he casts with his wand often go awry, and it may take multiple tries to get it right. A running gag is his tendency to call Sam by the wrong name.
 The Mime Lady (Nikki Tilroe): A mime character seen in quiz segments of the show. Tilroe also provided voices for several other characters.

References

Episodes 
  (Incomplete) 

1981 - Season one:

"Hats" - Jeff wonders what hats are. The gang learns that there are all kinds of hats, with Sam singing with his cowboy hat, magic hats, and by the end of the night, nightcaps as everyone, even TXL falls asleep.

"Snow" - Everyone, especially Jeff is excited that it's going to snow. Learning that it's frozen water, Jeff realizes that you need a big wintery outfit to go out in the snow, complete with a coat, mittens, and a big red scarf. When Sam's memory of playing in the snow with Jodie finally comes true, the gang learns that Muff is just shovelling snow off the roof to make it look like snow is falling down the window.

"Noses" - Today at the department store, everyone is doing something with their noses. Jodie's smells sweet flowers, Muffy's is all stuffed up while she has a cold, Sam learns a thing or two about sneezing from TXL, and Jeff is worried that his nose would fall off. With Sam telling him that a nose is attached to your body, along with a fact or two about an elephant's trunk, everybody is glad to have one thing, and that's a nose!

"Family" - It seems that everyone who works at the store has a family - except for Jeff. Learning that families are "a group of people that love and care for each other," he lets the audience know that they should be glad to have a family, unlike him. Sam and Jodie see newborn babies at the hospital nursery, while Jeff tries to take a "family picture" with mannequins. Later as the security alarm rings, we learn that Jodie's aunt came over to pay her a visit, who tells Jeff later on with Jodie that he does a family, letting him know that "...families are people who look out for each other and help each other," referencing to his friends, the episode ends as she remarks, "a very special family."

"Camping " - Jodie is having trouble putting up a tent on display, with it collapsing down on her. With Sam helping her, instead of a now angrily distraught Muffy, they quickly set up the tent to fast-paced music. Upset that Jeff can't go camping himself, Jodie decides to have a campout in the department store. A left-out Muffy, overhearing their plans, decides to play a trick or two on the three. With a boot-and-plastic-fish-catch, a card game of go fish, a plush skunk, a tape recorder playing sounds of mountain lions and crickets, and even a bit of detective work, the threesome have plenty of fun, a surprise or two, and catch the trickster- Muffy. Owning up to her mistakes, she joins the rest of the group as they sing a song about camping, just in time for her to reveal that she was the one who bent the tent poles as the tent comes crashing down yet again.

External links 
 
 Various episodes to view at the TVO Archive
 Today's Special at SITE123
 Today's Special at Facebook
 An unofficial fan site.

1980s Canadian children's television series
1980s Nickelodeon original programming
1981 Canadian television series debuts
1987 Canadian television series endings
Canadian television shows featuring puppetry
Department stores in fiction
Television shows filmed in Toronto
Television series set in shops
Treehouse TV original programming
TVO original programming